Sigurlín Margrét Sigurðardóttir (born 23 April 1964) is the first deaf person to be a member of Alþingi, on 1 October 2003 as a then-member of the Icelandic Liberal Party, serving for three months as a replacement for Gunnar Örlygsson while he served a sentence for fishery violations.

In 2007 she left the Liberal Party along with several members, joining the Icelandic Movement – Living Country.

References

Website 
 Sigurlín's Blog (Icelandic)

1964 births
Living people
Icelandic women in politics
Politicians with disabilities
Sigurlin Margret Sugurdardottir
Deaf politicians
Liberal Party (Iceland) politicians
Icelandic Movement – Living Country politicians
Icelandic deaf people